The Belgian Olympic and Interfederal Committee,  abbreviated BOIC or COIB, is the National Olympic Committee for Belgium. The administrative seat is located in Brussels.

History
The Belgian Olympic and Interfederal Committee was founded and recognized by International Olympic Committee in 1906.

List of presidents

Executive committee
 President: Jean-Michel Saive
 Vice Presidents: Tom Van Damme, Dominique Monami
 CEO: Cédric Van Branteghem
 Treasurer: Pascal Mertens
 Members: Dominique Gavage, Sven Serré, Yuhan Tan, Gwenda Stevens

Member federations
The Belgian National Federations are the organizations that coordinate all aspects of their individual sports. They are responsible for training, competition and development of their sports. There are currently 32 Olympic Summer and 7 Winter Sport Federations in Belgium.

See also
Belgium at the Olympics

References

External links
 Official website

 
National Olympic Committees
Olympic
1906 establishments in Belgium
Sports organizations established in 1906